The Meissen Fountain is a historic decorative fountain made of Meissen porcelain. It is "the largest single Meissen porcelain figure group in existence." It is held at the Victoria and Albert Museum in London, United Kingdom.

History
The Meissen Fountain was designed from 1745 to 1757. It shows Amphitrite and Neptune drawn by hippocampi. It was displayed by Count Heinrich von Brühl at his state dinners. For example, Sir Charles Hanbury Williams, who served as the British ambassador in Dresden, mentions it in his writings. Between 1774 and 1815, some parts were added.

The fountain was acquired by the Victoria and Albert Museum in London, United Kingdom, in 1870. Under the leadership of Reino Leifkes, it was restored in 2014, in collaboration with the Royal College of Art. As the fountain was broken in pieces, 3D modelling was used to rebuild it.

References

External links
Victoria and Albert Museum: The Meissen Fountain on YouTube

Fountains in the United Kingdom
Meissen porcelain